Marcel Malie Gomis (born 20 August 1987) is a Senegalese former professional footballer who played as a right winger.

Football career
Born in Dakar, Gomis arrived in Portugal at the age of 19 as he signed for F.C. Famalicão in the third division. In the following transfer window he moved to S.C. Olhanense, proceeding to appear regularly over the course of one-and-a-half second level seasons, but mostly as a substitute.

In 2008, Gomis joined FC Shinnik Yaroslavl in Russia, appearing rarely during his spell and also suffering relegation from the Premier League. He subsequently returned to the Algarve with Olhanense but, in January 2010, after only 76 minutes of official play in the first half of his first season – against F.C. Paços de Ferreira in the Portuguese League Cup– he was loaned to F.C. Vizela from division three for one-and-a-half seasons.

In summer 2011, Gomis was released by Olhanense and returned to Famalicão, still in the third tier. He continued to compete mainly in that level in the following years.

References

External links

1987 births
Footballers from Dakar
Living people
Senegalese footballers
Association football wingers
F.C. Famalicão players
S.C. Olhanense players
FC Shinnik Yaroslavl players
F.C. Vizela players
C.D. Trofense players
Juventude de Pedras Salgadas players
F.C. Pedras Rubras players
Rebordosa A.C. players
G.D. Joane players
Liga Portugal 2 players
Russian Premier League players
Segunda Divisão players
Campeonato de Portugal (league) players
Senegalese expatriate footballers
Expatriate footballers in Portugal
Senegalese expatriate sportspeople in Portugal
Expatriate footballers in Russia
Senegalese expatriate sportspeople in Russia